The Wakhi people, also locally referred to as the Wokhik, are an Iranian ethnic group native to Central and South Asia. They are found in Afghanistan, Tajikistan, Pakistan and China—primarily situated in and around Afghanistan's Wakhan Corridor, the northernmost part of Pakistan's Gilgit−Baltistan and Chitral, Tajikistan's Gorno−Badakhshan Autonomous Region and the southwestern areas of China's Xinjiang Uyghur Autonomous Region. The Wakhi people are native speakers of the Wakhi language, an Eastern Iranian language.

Name 
The Wakhi people refer to themselves as Khik and to their language as Khik zik. The exonym Wakhī, which is given to them by their neighbors, is based on Wux̌, the local name of the region of Wakhan, deriving from *Waxšu, the old name of the Oxus River (Amu Darya), which is a major river formed by the junction of the Vakhsh and Panj rivers on the border between Tajikistan and Afghanistan.

Demographics 

Ethnic Wakhi-speakers have a total population of about 50,000–58,000. The population is divided between four countries: Afghanistan, Tajikistan, Pakistan and China's Xinjiang. The Wakhi people have been settlers of their lands for hundreds if not thousands of years. The machinations of The Great Game during the eighteenth and nineteenth century created boundaries which separated the large body of the Wakhis into living in four countries.

In Tajikistan, Wakhi are inhabitants of Roshtqal'a District and Ishkoshim District of Gorno-Badakhshan Autonomous Region.

In Afghanistan, Wakhi primarily live in the Wakhan region of Badakhshan Province.

In Gilgit-Baltistan in the north of Pakistan, Wakhi predominantly live in the upper region of Hunza popularly known as Gojal. Wakhi speakers also live in Ishkoman Valley of District Ghizer, and some villages of Yasin Valley.

In Pakistan, Wakhi also live in Broghal in Chitral district of Khyber Pakhtunkhwa province.

In China, Wakhi are inhabitants of Taxkorgan Tajik Autonomous County an administrative area within Kashgar Prefecture of Xinjiang, mainly in the township of Dafdar.

In China, the Wakhi people, together with the Sarikoli people, are officially recognized as "Tajiks", with ethnic-minority autonomous status. In Afghanistan, they are officially called "Pamiri". In Tajikistan, they are recognized by the state as "Tajiks", but self-identify as "Pamiri". In Pakistan, they refer to themselves as "Wakhi" or "Pamiri" or "Gujali".

The Wakhi predominantly adhere to Nizari Ismaili Shia Islam, which is regarded as their ethnic religion and are followers of the Aga Khan.

Economy 
The Wakhi are primarily nomadic, depending on their herds of yaks and horses. They often have two residences—one for winter and one for summer. Their houses are built of stone and sod.

Cultural preservation 
Activists and researchers have been working to preserve and record the language of the Wakhi people, and have developed Wakhi orthographies using the Arabic, Cyrillic, and Latin scripts.

In 1990, the Gojali Wakhis of Pakistan established the "Wakhi Tajik Cultural Association", which aimed to preserve, document, and publish their "local culture". The association introduced a script that was applied into linguistic and literary textbooks, and organized cultural festivals. Radio Pakistan's Radio Gilgit also aired a daily Wakhi-language program named Bam-e Dunya ("Roof of the World").

See also 
 Wakhan mountains
 Pamiris

Notes and references

Bibliography 
 
 ; 1st paperback edition with new preface and epilogue (2002), .

External links 
  (slideshow)
 
 
https://franklin.library.upenn.edu/catalog/FRANKLIN_9977642433803681

 
Pamiri people
Ethnic groups in Pakistan
Ethnic groups in Afghanistan
Social groups of Gilgit Baltistan
Ethnic groups in Badakhshan Province
Ethnic groups in China
Ethnic groups in Tajikistan
Muslim communities of China
Iranian ethnic groups
Iranian nomads
Ethnic groups in South Asia